Jang Sun-yong (born 6 August 1951) is a North Korean Olympic archer. She represented her country in the women's individual competition at the 1976 Summer Olympics. She came in 4th place after rounds one and two, missing out on a medal by just 2 points out of 2407. She won a bronze medal at the 1978 Asian Games in the women's team event.

References

1951 births
Living people
North Korean female archers
Olympic archers of North Korea
Archers at the 1976 Summer Olympics
Asian Games medalists in archery
Archers at the 1978 Asian Games
Asian Games bronze medalists for North Korea
Medalists at the 1978 Asian Games
20th-century North Korean women